Mary Fox (née FitzPatrick) (1746-1778) 2nd Baroness Holland, was a daughter of John FitzPatrick, and wife of Stephen Fox, 2nd Baron Holland, whom she married on 20 April 1766.  They had one son, the notable Henry Vassall-Fox, 3rd Baron Holland born at Winterslow House, Wiltshire, on 21 November 1773.

She was the sister of John FitzPatrick, 2nd Earl of Upper Ossory; the Hon. General Richard FitzPatrick, Chief Secretary for Ireland (who also served twice as Secretary at War), and Louisa FitzPatrick Petty, 1st Marchioness of Lansdowne.

References

External links
Fitzpatrick - Mac Giolla Phádraig Clan Society

Mary
1746 births
1778 deaths
British baronesses
Daughters of Irish earls